Handoo (Kashmiri: हंडू (Devanagari),  (Nastaleeq)), also spelled as Handu, is a Kashmiri surname.  It is native to the Kashmir Valley in India, and is primarily found among Kashmiri Hindus and Kashmiri Muslims of Hindu lineage.

People with the name 
 Kuldeep Handoo
 Piyare Lal Handoo

See also 
[[Suraj handoo

References

Kashmiri tribes
Indian surnames
Pakistani names
Kashmiri-language surnames
Social groups of Jammu and Kashmir